The Alternative for Germany donation scandal was a political scandal that broke in 2018 in which the Alternative for Germany party (AfD) was found to have accepted financial contributions in contravention of conditions within German laws regulating donations to political parties.

In the three months leading up to the 2017 general election the AfD regional office for the Lake Constance area received 18 weekly payments totalling 132,000 Euro documented as "campaign donations for Alice Weidel". Alice Weidel is deputy chairman of the regional party organisation and co-chair of the AfD parliamentary group in the Bundestag. At the beginning of 2018 they received a further 150,000 Euros. These were not declared as required by law and apparently disguised as to their true source and aggregate amount. Further irregular contributions to AfD party politicians were identified, including to Jörg Meuthen, Guido Reil and Marcus Petzell.

According to media reports, the payments came from billionaire property tycoon Henning Conle though several intermediaries and split into smaller amounts. The AfD has been ordered to pay over 500,000 Euro to the federal government, including the illegal sums and penalties.

References

2018 in Germany
Political scandals in Germany
Donation scandal